Buffie Johnson (February 12, 1912 – August 11, 2006) was an American painter, associated with the Abstract Imagists.

Biography
Born in New York City, Johnson studied in her youth at the Académie Julian in Paris and at the Art Students League of New York. She had lessons with Francis Picabia and Stanley William Hayter, and she earned a Master of Arts degree from the University of California, Los Angeles. In 1943, Johnson was included in Peggy Guggenheim's show Exhibition by 31 Women at the Art of This Century gallery in New York. From 1946 to 1950 she taught at the Parsons School of Design. She received many awards, including fellowships from Yaddo, the Bollingen Foundation, and the Edward Albee Foundation and her work appeared at the Whitney Biennial on multiple occasions. Organizations holding examples of her work include the Museum of Fine Arts, Boston; the National Collection of Fine Arts; the Walker Art Center; the Whitney Museum of American Art; and Yale University. In 1988 she published Lady of the Beasts: Ancient Images of the Goddess and Her Sacred Animals. Twice married – her second husband was the critic Gerald Sykes – Johnson was survived by a daughter.

Legacy
She was posthumously awarded the Lifetime Achievement Award for Women in the Arts 2007 by the College Art Association Committee on Women in the Arts (CWA) and the Women's Caucus for Art (WCA).

Johnson's image is included in the iconic 1972 poster Some Living American Women Artists by Mary Beth Edelson.

References

External links
images of Buffie Johnson's paintings on artNET
Buffie Johnson in the Smithsonian American Art Museum

1912 births
2006 deaths
American women painters
20th-century American painters
20th-century American women artists
21st-century American painters
21st-century American women artists
Painters from New York City
Académie Julian alumni
Art Students League of New York alumni
University of California, Los Angeles alumni
Parsons School of Design faculty
American women academics